This article lists the genera of the Archaea. The currently accepted taxonomy is based on the List of Prokaryotic names with Standing in Nomenclature (LPSN) and National Center for Biotechnology Information (NCBI). However, in the List provided below, GTDB has precedence unless otherwise noted.

Phylogeny 
National Center for Biotechnology Information (NCBI) taxonomy was initially used to decorate the genome tree via tax2tree. The 16S rRNA-based Greengenes taxonomy is used to supplement the taxonomy particularly in regions of the tree with no cultured representatives. List of Prokaryotic names with Standing in Nomenclature (LPSN) is used as the primary taxonomic authority for establishing naming priorities. Taxonomic ranks are normalised using phylorank and the taxonomy manually curated to remove polyphyletic groups.

Cladogram was taken from the GTDB release 07-RS207 (8 April 2022). The position of clades with a "question mark" are based on the additional phylogeny of the 16S rRNA-based LTP_12_2021 by The All-Species Living Tree Project.

Phylum "Altarchaeota"

Class "Altarchaeia"

Order "Altarchaeales"
 Family "Altarchaeaceae" corrig. Probst et al. 2014
 "Candidatus Altarchaeum" corrig. Probst et al. 2014

Phylum "Iainarchaeota"

Class "Iainarchaeia"

Order 0-14-0-20-30-16
 Family CSSED10-239
 "Candidatus Forterrea" Probst & Banfield 2017

Order "Iainarchaeales"
 Family "Iainarchaeaceae" Rinke et al. 2020
 "Candidatus Iainarchaeum" Rinke et al. 2013

Phylum "Micrarchaeota"

Class "Micrarchaeia"

Order "Norongarragalinales"
 Family "Norongarragalinaceae" Vázquez-Campos et al. 2021
 "Candidatus Norongarragalina" Vázquez-Campos et al. 2021

Order "Micrarchaeales"
 Family "Micrarchaeaceae" Vázquez-Campos et al. 2021
 "Candidatus Mancarchaeum" Golyshina et al. 2017
 "Candidatus Micrarchaeum" Baker et al. 2010

Order "Burarchaeales"
 Family "Burarchaeaceae" Vázquez-Campos et al. 2021
 "Candidatus Burarchaeum" Vázquez-Campos et al. 2021

Order "Fermentimicrarchaeales"
 Family "Fermentimicrarchaeaceae" Kadnikov et al. 2020 (Sv326)
 "Candidatus Fermentimicrarchaeum" Kadnikov et al. 2020

Order "Gugararchaeales"
 Family "Gugararchaeaceae" Vázquez-Campos et al. 2021
 "Candidatus Gugararchaeum" Vázquez-Campos et al. 2021

Order "Anstonellales"
 Family "Anstonellaceae" Vázquez-Campos et al. 2021
 "Candidatus Anstonella" Vázquez-Campos et al. 2021
 Family "Bilamarchaeaceae" Vázquez-Campos et al. 2021
 "Candidatus Bilamarchaeum" Vázquez-Campos et al. 2021

Phylum "Undinarchaeota"

Class "Undinarchaeia"

Order "Undinarchaeales"
 Family "Naiadarchaeaceae" Dombrowski et al. 2020
 "Candidatus Naiadarchaeum" Dombrowski et al. 2020
 Family "Undinarchaeaceae" Dombrowski et al. 2020
 "Candidatus Undinarchaeum" Dombrowski et al. 2020

Phylum "Huberarchaeaota"

Class "Huberarchaeia"

Order "Huberarchaeales"
 Family "Huberarchaeaceae" Rinke et al. 2020
 "Candidatus Huberarchaeum" corrig. Schwank et al. 2019

Phylum "Aenigmatarchaeota"

Class "Aenigmatarchaeia"

Order "Aenigmatarchaeales"
 Family "Aenigmatarchaeaceae" corrig. Rinke et al. 2020
 "Candidatus Aenigmatarchaeum" corrig. Rinke et al. 2013

Phylum "Nanohalarchaeota"

Class "Nanohalarchaeia"

Order "Nanohalarchaeales"
 Family "Nanohalarchaeaceae"
 ?"Candidatus Nanohalarchaeum" corrig. Hamm et al. 2019

Class "Nanohalobiia"

Order "Nanohalobiales"
 Family "Nanohalobiaceae" La Cono et al. 2020
 ?"Candidatus Haloredivivus" Ghai et al. 2011
 ?"Candidatus Nanopetraeus" corrig. Crits‐Christoph et al. 2016
 "Candidatus Nanohalobium" La Cono et al. 2020
 "Candidatus Nanosalina" Narasingarao et al. 2012
 "Candidatus Nanosalinicola" corrig. Narasingarao et al. 2012

Phylum "Nanoarchaeota"

Class Nanobdellia

Order Nanobdellales
 Family Nanobdellaceae Kato et al. 2022
 ?Nanobdella Kato et al. 2022

Class "Nanoarchaeia"

Nanoarchaeia incertae sedis
 "Mamarchaeales"
 "Pacearchaeales" (DHVE-5, DUSEL-1)
 "Wiannamattarchaeales" Vazquez-Campos et al. 2019 (LFWA-II, Eury4AB)
 "Woesearchaeales" (DHVE-6)

Order "Tiddalikarchaeales"
 Family "Tiddalikarchaeaceae" Vázquez-Campos et al. 2021
 "Candidatus Tiddalikarchaeum" Vázquez-Campos et al. 2021

Order "Parvarchaeales"
 Family "Acidifodinimicrobiaceae" Luo et al. 2020
 ?"Candidatus Acidifodinimicrobium" Luo et al. 2020 
 Family "Parvarchaeaceae" Rinke et al. 2020
 "Candidatus Parvarchaeum" Baker et al. 2010 (ARMAN 4 & 5)

Order "Nanoarchaeales"
 Family "Nanoarchaeaceae" Huber et al. 2011
 "Nanoarchaeum" Huber et al. 2002
 Family "Nanopusillaceae" Huber et al. 2011
 "Candidatus Nanoclepta" St. John et al. 2019
 "Candidatus Nanopusillus" Wurch et al. 2016

Phylum "Asgardaeota"

Class "Tyrarchaeia"

Class "Sifarchaeia"

Order "Borrarchaeales"
 Family "Borrarchaeaceae" Liu et al. 2020
 "Candidatus Borrarchaeum" Liu et al. 2020

Order "Sifarchaeales"
 Family "Sifarchaeaceae" Sun et al. 2021
 "Candidatus Sifarchaeum" corrig. Farag, Zhao & Biddle 2020

Class "Wukongarchaeia"

Order "Wukongarchaeales"
 Family "Wukongarchaeaceae" Liu et al. 2020
 "Candidatus Wukongarchaeum" Liu et al. 2020

Class "Heimdallarchaeia"

Heimdallarchaeia Incertae sedis
 "Gerdarchaeales" 
 "Heimdallarchaeales"
 "Njordarchaeales" Xie et al. 2022

Order "Hodarchaeales"
 Family "Hodarchaeaceae" Liu et al. 2020
 "Candidatus Hodarchaeum" Liu et al. 2020

Order "Kariarchaeales"
 Family "Kariarchaeaceae" Liu et al. 2020
 "Candidatus Kariarchaeum" Liu et al. 2020

Class "Freyrarchaeia"
 Order "Freyrarchaeales" Xie et al. 2022

Class "Friggarchaeia"

Class "Gefionarchaeia"

Class "Idunnarchaeia"

Class "Jordarchaeia"

Order "Jordarchaeales"
 Family "Jordarchaeaceae" Sun et al. 2021
 "Candidatus Jordarchaeum" Sun et al. 2021

Class "Odinarchaeia"

Order "Odinarchaeales"
 Family "Odinarchaeaceae" Tamarit et al. 2022
 "Candidatus Odinarchaeum" Tamarit et al. 2021

Class "Baldrarchaeia"

Order "Baldrarchaeales"
 Family "Baldrarchaeaceae" Liu et al. 2020
 "Candidatus Baldrarchaeum" Liu et al. 2020

Class "Thorarchaeia"

Order "Thorarchaeales"
 Family "Thorarchaeaceae" (MBG-B)

Class "Hermodarchaeia"

Order "Hermodarchaeales"
 Family "Hermodarchaeaceae" Liu et al. 2020
 "Candidatus Hermodarchaeum" Liu et al. 2020

Class "Lokiarchaeia"

Order "Helarchaeales"

Order "Sigynarchaeales"
 Family "Sigynarchaeacea" Xie et al. 2022

Order "Lokiarchaeales"
In GTDB as order CR-4
 Family "Lokiarchaeaceae" Vanwonterghem et al. 2016
 "Candidatus Lokiarchaeum" corrig. Spang et al. 2015 (MBGB, DSAG)
 Family "MK-D1" (syn. Ca. Prometheoarchaeaceae)
 "Candidatus Promethearchaeum" corrig. Imachi, Nobu & Takai 2020
 "Candidatus Harpocratesius" Wu et al. 2022

Phylum "Thermoproteota"

Thermoproteota Incertae sedis
 "Bathyarchaeia" Meng et al. 2014
 "Brockarchaeia"

Class "Korarchaeia"

Order "Korarchaeales"
 Family "Korarchaeaceae" Rinke et al. 2020
 "Candidatus Korarchaeum" Elkins et al. 2008
 "Candidatus Methanodesulfokora" McKay et al. 2019

Class Nitrososphaeria_A

Order "Caldarchaeales"
 Family "Caldarchaeaceae" Rinke et al. 2020
 "Candidatus Caldarchaeum" corrig. Nunoura et al. 2011 (HWCGI)
 ?"Candidatus Calditenuis" corrig. Beam et al. 2016

Class Nitrososphaeria

Nitrososphaeria Incertae sedis
 "Cenoporarchaeum" corrig. Zhang et al. 2019
 "Candidatus Gigantothauma" corrig. Muller et al. 2010
 "Candidatus Nitrosodeserticola" Hwang et al. 2021
 "Candidatus Benthortus" Buessecker et al. 2022

Order "Geothermarchaeales"
 Family "Geothermarchaeaceae"

Order "Conexivisphaerales"
 Family "Conexivisphaeraceae" Kato et al. 2021 (THSC Group)
 Conexivisphaera Kato et al. 2021

Order Nitrososphaerales

 Family "Methylarchaceae" Hua et al. 2019
 "Candidatus Methylarchaeum" Hua et al. 2019
 Family "Nitrosocaldaceae" Qin et al. 2016
 ?"Candidatus Nitrosothermus" Luo et al. 2021
 "Candidatus Nitrosocaldus" de la Torre et al. 2008
 Family Nitrososphaeraceae Stieglmeier et al. 2014
 "Candidatus Nitrosocosmicus" corrig. Lehtovirta-Morley et al. 2016
 ?"Candidatus Nitrosopolaris" Pessi, Rutanen & Hultman 2022
 Nitrososphaera Stieglmeier et al. 2014
 Family Nitrosopumilaceae Qin et al. 2017
 ?"Candidatus Nitrosospongia" Moeller et al. 2019
 "Cenarchaeum" DeLong & Preston 1996
 Nitrosarchaeum corrig. Jung et al. 2018
 "Candidatus Nitrosopelagicus" Santoro et al. 2015
 Nitrosopumilus Qin et al. 2017
 "Candidatus Nitrosotalea" Lehtovirta 2011
 "Candidatus Nitrosotenuis" Lebedeva et al. 2013

Class "Methanomethylicia"

Order "Methanohydrogenicales"
 Family "Methanohydrogenicaceae" Berghuis et al. 2019
 ?"Candidatus Methanohydrogenicus" Berghuis et al. 2019

Order "Methanomediales"
 Family "Methanomediaceae" Berghuis et al. 2019
 ?"Candidatus Methanomedium" Berghuis et al. 2019

Order "Methanomethylarchaeales"
 Family "Methanomethylarchaeceae" corrig. Hua et al. 2019
 ?"Candidatus Methanomethylarchaeum" corrig. Hua et al. 2019

Order "Methanomethylovorales"
 Family "Methanomethylovoraceae" Hua et al. 2019
 ?"Candidatus Methanomethylovorus" Hua et al. 2019

Order "Nezhaarchaeales"
 Family "Methanohydrogenotrophicaceae" Hua et al. 2019
 ?"Candidatus Methanogearchaeum" corrig. Hua et al. 2019
 ?"Candidatus Methanohydrogenotrophicum" Hua et al. 2019

Order "Methanomethylicales"
 Family "Candidatus Methanomethylicaceae" corrig. Vanwonterghem et al. 2016
 "Candidatus Methanomethylicus" Vanwonterghem et al. 2016
 "Candidatus Methanosuratinicola" corrig. Vanwonterghem et al. 2016

Class Thermoproteia

Thermoproteia Incertae sedis
 "Gearchaeales" corrig. (NAG1/NGCI)
 "Marsarchaeales" (BE-D, NAG2, YNPFFA, NCGII)

Order Thermofilales
 Family Thermofilaceae Burggraf, Huber & Stetter 1997
 Infirmifilum Zayulina et al. 2021
 Thermofilum Zillig & Gierl 1983

Order Thermoproteales

 Family Thermoproteaceae Zillig & Stetter 1982
 Pyrobaculum Huber, Kristjansson & Stetter 1988
 Thermoproteus Zillig & Stetter 1982
 Family "Thermocladiaceae" Rinke et al. 2020
 Caldivirga Itoh et al. 1999
 Thermocladium Itoh, Suzuki & Nakase 1998
 Vulcanisaeta Itoh, Suzuki & Nakase 2002

Order Sulfolobales

 Family Fervidicoccaceae Perevalova et al. 2010
 Fervidicoccus Perevalova et al. 2010
 Family "Ignicoccaceae" Rinke et al. 2020
 Ignicoccus Huber, Burggraf & Stetter 2000
 Family Pyrodictiaceae Burggraf, Huber & Stetter 1997
 ?Geogemma Kashefi, Holmes & Lovley 2006
 Hyperthermus Zillig, Holz & Wunderl 1991
 Pyrodictium Stetter, König & Stackebrandt 1984
 Pyrolobus Blochl et al. 1999
 Family Acidilobaceae Prokofeva et al. 2009
 Aeropyrum Sako et al. 1996
 Acidilobus Prokofeva et al. 2000
 Caldisphaera Itoh et al. 2003
 ?Stetteria Jochimsen, Peinemann-Simon & Thomm 1998
 ?Thermodiscus Stetter 2003
 Family Desulfurococcaceae Zillig & Stetter 1983
 ?Caldococcus Aoshima, Yamagishi & Oshima 1996
 Desulfurococcus Zillig & Stetter 1983
 Staphylothermus Stetter & Fiala 1986
 ?Sulfophobococcus Hensel et al. 1997
 Thermogladius Osburn & Amend 2011 ex Kochetkova et al. 2016
 Thermosphaera Huber et al. 1998
 Family "Ignisphaeraceae" Rinke et al. 2020
 Ignisphaera Niederberger et al. 2006
 Family NBVN01
 Zestosphaera St. John et al. 2021
 Family Sulfolobaceae Stetter 1989
 Acidianus Segerer et al. 1986
 "Candidatus Aramenus" Servín-Garcidueñas & Martínez-Romero 2014
 Metallosphaera Huber et al. 1989
 Saccharolobus Sakai & Kurosawa 2018
 Stygiolobus Segerer et al. 1991
 Sulfodiicoccus Sakai & Kurosawa 2017
 Sulfolobus Brock et al. 1972
 Sulfuracidifex Itoh et al. 2020
 Sulfurisphaera Kurosawa et al. 1998
 ?Sulfurococcus Golovacheva, Vale’kho & Troitskii 1995

Phylum "Hadarchaeota"

Class "Persephonarchaeia"

Class "Hadarchaeia"

Order "Hadarchaeales"
 Family "Hadarchaeaceae" Chuvochina et al. 2019
 ?"Candidatus Hadesarchaeum" Hua et al. 2019
 ?"Candidatus Methanourarchaeum" Hua et al. 2019
 "Candidatus Hadarchaeum" Chuvochina et al. 2019

Phylum Methanobacteriota_B

Class "Theionarchaeia"

Class Thermococci

Order "Methanofastidiosales"
 Family "Methanofastidiosaceae" Rinke et al. 2020
 "Candidatus Methanofastidiosum" corrig. Nobu et al. 2016

Order Thermococcales
 Family Thermococcaceae Zillig et al. 1988
 Palaeococcus Takai et al. 2000
 Pyrococcus Fiala & Stetter 1986
 Thermococcus Zillig 1983

Phylum Methanobacteriota_A
{{cladogram|title=Phylogeny of Methanobacteriota_A|
{{clade|style=font-size:90%;line-height:90%;width:300px
|1={{clade
  |label1=Methanopyri
  |1=
  |2={{clade
    |label1=Methanococci
    |sublabel1=Methanococcales
    |1={{clade
      |label1=Methanocaldococcaceae
      |1=Methanocaldococcus
      |label2=Methanococcaceae
      |2={{clade
        |1='Methanotorris        |2=
         }}
       }}
     }}
   }}
}}
}}

Class Methanopyri
Order Methanopyrales
 Family Methanopyraceae Huber & Stetter 2002
 Methanopyrus Kurr et al. 1992

Class Methanococci
Order Methanococcales
Family Methanocaldococcaceae Whitman 2002
 Methanocaldococcus Whitman 2002
 Family Methanococcaceae Balch & Wolfe 1981
 Methanococcus Kluyver & van Niel 1936
 Methanofervidicoccus Sakai et al. 2019
 Methanothermococcus Whitman 2002
 Methanotorris Whitman 2002

Phylum "Hydrothermarchaeota"
Class "Hydrothermarchaeia"
Order "Hydrothermarchaeales"
 Family "Hydrothermarchaeaceae" Chuvochina et al. 2019
 "Candidatus Hydrothermarchaeum" Chuvochina et al. 2019

Phylum "Methanobacteriota"

Class Methanobacteria
Order Tepidaquicellales
 Family "Tepidaquicellaceae" corrig. Kadnikov et al. 2020
 "Candidatus Tepidaquicella" corrig. Kadnikov et al. 2020

Order Methanobacteriales
 Family Methanothermaceae Stetter et al. 1982
 Methanothermus Stetter et al. 1982
 Family "Methanothermobacteraceae" Rinke et al. 2020
 Methanothermobacter Wasserfallen et al. 2000
 Family Methanobacteriaceae Barker 1956
 Methanobacterium Kluyver & van Niel 1936
 Methanobrevibacter Balch & Wolfe 1981
 Methanosphaera Miller & Wolin 1985

Phylum "Thermoplasmatota"

Class "Izemarchaea"
Order "Thermoprofundales"
 (MBG-D, E2)

Class "Pontarchaea"
Order MGIII
 (MGIII High GC)
 (MGIII Low GC)

Class "Poseidoniia"
Order "Poseidoniales"
 Family "Poseidoniaceae" corrig. Rinke et al. 2019
 "Candidatus Poseidonia" Rinke et al. 2019
 Family "Thalassarchaeaceae" corrig. Rinke et al. 2019
 "Candidatus Thalassarchaeum" corrig. Martin-Cuadrado et al. 2015

Class Thermoplasmata
Order "Lunaplasmatales"
 Family "Lunaplasmataceae" Zinke et al. 2021
 ?"Candidatus Lunaplasma" Zinke et al. 2021

Order "Proteinoplasmatales"

Order "Sysuiplasmatales"
 Family "Sysuiplasmataceae" Yuan et al. 2021
 ?"Candidatus Sysuiplasma" Yuan et al. 2021

Order "Gimiplasmatales"
 Family "Gimiplasmataceae" Hu et al. 2020
 "Candidatus Gimiplasma" Hu et al. 2020

Order Methanomassiliicoccales

 ?"Candidatus Methanarcanum" Chibani et al. 2022
 Family "Methanomixtatrophicaceae" Hua et al. 2019
 ?"Candidatus Methanomixtatrophicum" Hua et al. 2019
 Family Methanomassiliicoccaceae Iino et al. 2013
 Methanomassiliicoccus Dridi et al. 2012
 Family "Methanomethylophilaceae" Gaci et al. 2014
 "Candidatus Methanogranum" corrig. Iino et al. 2013
 "Candidatus Methanomethylophilus" corrig. Borrel et al. 2012
 "Candidatus Methanoplasma" corrig. Lang et al. 2015
 "Candidatus Methanospyradousia" Gilroy et al. 2021

Order PWKY01
 Family PWKY01
 ?"Candidatus Haladaptoplasma" Zhou et al. 2022
 ?"Candidatus Haloplasma" Zhou et al. 2022 non Antunes et al. 2008
 "Candidatus Natronoplasma" Zhou et al. 2022
 ?"Candidatus Saliniplasma" Zhou et al. 2022

Order "Aciduliprofundales"
 Family "Aciduliprofundaceae" Rinke et al. 2020
 "Aciduliprofundum" Reysenbach et al. 2006 (DHVE2 group)

Order Thermoplasmatales

 Family Thermoplasmataceae Reysenbach 2002
 Acidiplasma Golyshina et al. 2009
 Cuniculiplasma corrig. Golyshina et al. 2016
 Ferroplasma Golyshina et al. 2000
 Picrophilus Schleper et al. 1996
 ?"Candidatus Scheffleriplasma" Krause et al. 2022
 Thermogymnomonas Itoh, Yoshikawa & Takashina 2007
 Thermoplasma Darland et al. 1970

Phylum "Halobacteriota"

Halobacteriota incertae sedis
 "Candidatus Methanotowutia" Ou et al. 2022
 "Candidatus Methanoinsularis" Ou et al. 2022
 "Candidatus Methanoporticola" Ou et al. 2022

Order "Methanoflorentales"
 Family "Methanoflorentaceae" Mondav et al. 2014
 "Candidatus Methanoflorens" Mondav et al. 2014

Class "Methanoliparia"
Order "Methanoliparales"
 Family "Methanoliparaceae" Borrel et al. 2019
 "Candidatus Methanoliparum" Borrel et al. 2019
 "Candidatus Methanolliviera" Borrel et al. 2019

Class Archaeoglobi
Order Archaeoglobales

 Family "Allopolytropaceae" corrig. Boyd et al. 2019
 ?"Candidatus Allopolytropus" corrig. Boyd et al. 2019
 Family Archaeoglobaceae Huber & Stetter 2002
 ?"Candidatus Methanomixotrophus" corrig. Liu et al. 2020
 ?"Candidatus Methanoproducendum" Hua et al. 2019
 Archaeoglobus Stetter 1988
 Ferroglobus Hafenbradl et al. 1997
 Geoglobus Kashefi et al. 2002

Class "Syntropharchaeia"
Order "Methanophagales"
 Family "Methanophagaceae" Chadwick et al. 2022
 ?"Candidatus Methanophaga"" Chadwick et al. 2022
 ?"Candidatus Methanoalium" Chadwick et al. 2022

Order "Syntropharchaeales"
 Family "Syntropharchaeaceae" corrig. (ANME-2 cluster)
 "Candidatus Syntropharchaeum" corrig. Laso-Perez et al. 2016

Class "Methanocellia"
Order Methanocellales
 Family Methanocellaceae Sakai et al. 2008
 Methanocella Sakai et al. 2008

Class "Methanosarcinia"
Order "Methanotrichales"
 Family Methanotrichaceae Akinyemi et al. 2021
 Methanothrix Huser, Wuhrmann & Zehnder 1983

Order Methanosarcinales_A
 Family Methermicoccaceae Cheng et al. 2007
 Methermicoccus Cheng et al. 2007

Order Methanosarcinales

 Family "Methanogasteraceae" Chadwick et al. 2022 (ANME-2c)
 "Candidatus Methanogaster" Chadwick et al. 2022
 Family "Methanocomedenaceae" Chadwick et al. 2022 
 "Candidatus Methanocomedens" Chadwick et al. 2022 (ANME-2a)
 "Candidatus Methanomarinus" Chadwick et al. 2022 (ANME-2b)
 Family EX4572-44
 "Candidatus Ethaniperedens" corrig. Hahn et al. 2020
 Family "Methanoperedentaceae" corrig. Haroon et al. 2013 
 ?"Candidatus Argarchaeum" corrig. Chen et al. 2019 (GOM arc I)
 "Candidatus Methanoperedens" Haroon et al. 2013 (ANME-2d, AAA)
 Family Methanosarcinaceae Balch & Wolfe 1981
 ?Halomethanococcus Yu & Kawamura 1988
 Methanimicrococcus corrig. Sprenger et al. 2000
 Methanococcoides Sowers & Ferry 1985
 Methanohalobium Zhilina & Zavarzin 1988
 Methanohalophilus Paterek & Smith 1988
 Methanolobus König & Stetter 1983
 Methanomethylovorans Lomans et al. 2004
 Methanosalsum Boone & Baker 2002
 Methanosarcina Kluyver & van Niel 1936
 ?"Candidatus Methanovorans" Chadwick et al. 2022 (ANME-3)

Class Methanomicrobia
Order "Alkanophagales"

Order Methanomicrobiales

 Family Methanocorpusculaceae Zellner et al. 1989
 Methanocalculus Ollivier et al. 1998 
 Methanocorpusculum Zellner et al. 1988
 Family "Methanofollaceae" 
 Methanofollis Zellner et al. 1999
 Family "Methanosphaerulaceae" Rinke et al. 2020
 Methanosphaerula Cadillo-Quiroz et al. 2009
 Family Methanospirillaceae Boone et al. 2002
 Methanospirillum Ferry, Smith & Wolfe 1974
 Family Methanoregulaceae Sakai et al. 2012
 Methanolinea Imachi et al. 2008
 Methanoregula Brauer et al. 2011
 Family "Methanoculleaceae" Rinke et al. 2020
 Methanoculleus Maestrojun et al. 1990
 Family Methanomicrobiaceae Balch & Wolfe 1981
 Methanogenium Romesser et al. 1981
 Methanolacinia Zellner et al. 1990
 Methanomicrobium Balch & Wolfe 1981
 Methanoplanus Wildgruber et al. 1984

Class "Hikarchaeia"
Order "Hikarchaeales"
 Family "Hikarchaeaceae" Martijn et al. 2020 (MG-IV)
 ?"Candidatus Hikarchaeum" Martijn et al. 2020

Class "Methanonatronarchaeia"
Order "Methanonatronarchaeales"
 Family "Methanohalarchaeaceae" Sorokin et al. 2018
 "Candidatus Methanohalarchaeum" Sorokin et al. 2018
 Family Methanonatronarchaeaceae Sorokin et al. 2018
 Methanonatronarchaeum Sorokin et al. 2018

Class Halobacteria
Order Halobacteriales

 Halobacteriales incertae sedis
 "Haloalcalophilium" Lizama et al. 2000a
 Family "Halalkalicoccaceae" 
 Halalkalicoccus Xue et al. 2005
 Family "Haladaptaceae" Rinke et al. 2020
 Haladaptatus Savage et al. 2007
 ?Halomicrococcus Chen et al. 2020
 Halorussus Cui et al. 2014
 Family Halobacteriaceae 
 Halanaeroarchaeum Sorokin et al. 2016
 Halarchaeum Minegishi et al. 2010
 Halobacterium Elazari-Volcani 1957
 Halocalculus Minegishi et al. 2015
 Halodesulfurarchaeum Sorokin et al. 2017
 Sala Song et al. 2022
 Salarchaeum Shimane et al. 2011
 Family "Salinarchaeaceae" 
 Salinarchaeum Cui et al. 2014
 Family QS-9-68-17
 Halostella Song et al. 2016
 Family "Natronoarchaeaceae" Sorokin et al. 2022
 ?"Natranaeroarchaeum" Sorokin et al. 2021
 Natronoarchaeum Shimane et al. 2010
 Family Natrialbaceae Gupta et al. 2015
 Haloarchaeobius Makhdoumi-Kakhki et al. 2012
 Halobiforma Hezayen et al. 2002
 Halopiger Gutierrez et al. 2007
 Halorubellus Cui et al. 2014
 Halostagnicola Castillo et al. 2006
 Haloterrigena Ventosa et al. 1999
 Halovarius Mehrshad et al. 2015
 Halovivax Castillo et al. 2006
 Natrarchaeobaculum Sorokin et al. 2020
 Natrarchaeobius corrig. Sorokin et al. 2020
 Natrialba Kamekura & Dyall-Smith 1996
 Natribaculum Liu et al. 2015 
 Natronobacterium Tindall et al. 1984
 Natronobiforma Sorokin et al. 2019
 Natronococcus Tindall et al. 1984
 Natronolimnobius Itoh et al. 2005
 Natronolimnohabitans Sorokin et al. 2020
 Natrinema McGenity et al. 1998
 Natronorubrum Xu et al. 1999
 Salinadaptatus Xue et al. 2020 
 Saliphagus Yin et al. 2017
 Family Halococcaceae Gupta et al. 2016
 Halococcus Schoop 1935
 Family Haloarculaceae 
 Halapricum Song et al. 2014
 Haloarcula Torreblanca et al. 1986
 Halocatena Verma et al. 2020
 ?Halococcoides Sorokin et al. 2019
 "Haloglomus" Duran-Viseras, Sanchez-Porro & Ventosa 2020
 Halomarina Inoue et al. 2011
 Halomicroarcula Echigo et al. 2013
 Halomicrobium Oren et al. 2002
 Halorientalis Cui et al. 2011
 Halorhabdus Waino et al. 2000
 ?Halosegnis Duran-Viseras et al. 2022
 Halosimplex Vreeland et al. 2003
 Halovenus Makhdoumi-Kakhki et al. 2012
 Natronomonas Kamekura et al. 1997
 Salinibaculum Han & Cui 2020
 ?Salinirubellus Hou et al. 2018
 Salinirussus Cui et al. 2017
 Family Haloferacaceae Gupta et al. 2015
 Halalkaliarchaeum Sorokin et al. 2019
 "Halalkalirubrum" Zuo et al. 2021
 ?"Candidatus Halectosymbiota" corrig. Filker et al. 2014
 "Halegenticoccus" Liu et al. 2019
 Halobaculum Oren et al. 1995
 Halobellus Cui et al. 2011
 ?Halobium Mori et al. 2016
 Haloferax Torreblanca et al. 1986
 Halogeometricum Montalvo-Rodriguez et al. 1998 (Halosarcina)
 Halogranum Cui et al. 2010
 Halohasta Mou et al. 2013
 Halolamina Cui et al. 2011
 Halonotius Burns et al. 2010
 Haloparvum Chen et al. 2016
 Halopelagius Cui et al. 2010
 Halopenitus Amoozegar et al. 2012
 Haloplanus Elevi Bardavid et al. 2007
 Haloprofundus Zhang et al. 2017
 Haloquadratum Burns et al. 2007
 Halorubrum McGenity & Grant 1996
 ?Halosiccatus Mehrshad et al. 2016
 ?Natronocalculus Sorokin et al. 2022
 ?Salinirubrum corrig. Cui & Qiu 2014
 Salinigranum'' Cui & Zhang 2014

See also
 Branching order of bacterial phyla (Woese, 1987)
 Branching order of bacterial phyla (Gupta, 2001)
 Branching order of bacterial phyla (Cavalier-Smith, 2002)
 Branching order of bacterial phyla (Rappe and Giovanoni, 2003)
 Branching order of bacterial phyla (Battistuzzi et al.,2004)
 Branching order of bacterial phyla (Ciccarelli et al., 2006)
 Branching order of bacterial phyla after ARB Silva Living Tree
 Branching order of bacterial phyla (Genome Taxonomy Database, 2018)
 Bacterial phyla
 List of bacteria genera
 List of bacterial orders

References 

 
Archaea